Xombie may refer to:

Xombies, a 2004 zombie novel by Walter Greatshell 
Xombie (comics), series of Flash cartoons and comics produced by James Farr
Xombie (rocket), rocket created by Masten Space Systems
Xombie (band), hip hop / heavy metal band

See also
 Xombi, DC Comics character
 Zombie (disambiguation)